Charles Reiff (27 December 1940 – 24 December 1964) was a Luxembourgian boxer. He competed in the men's bantamweight event at the 1960 Summer Olympics. At the 1960 Summer Olympics, he lost to Thein Myint of Myanmar in the Round of 32.

References

External links
 

1940 births
1964 deaths
Luxembourgian male boxers
Olympic boxers of Luxembourg
Boxers at the 1960 Summer Olympics
People from Dudelange
Bantamweight boxers